Professor Dorthe Bomholdt Ravnsbæk is an inorganic / materials chemist who has been internationally recognized for her work in battery technology.

Background 
Ravnsbæk received her Ph.D. from the iNANO branch of Aarhus University in 2011, and was a postdoctoral researcher with Yet-Ming Chiang at the Massachusetts Institute of Technology. Ravnsbæk was appointed to the faculty of University of Southern Denmark in 2014. Her research focuses on different Metal hydride combinations that could potentially power batteries from cheap, abundant sodium ions in place of Lithium-ion battery materials. She co-Leads the ECOSTORE initiative at SDU.

Awards 
 2016 - L'Oréal-UNESCO For Women in Science Awards Rising Talent
 2011 - EuroScience Young Researcher Award

References 

Danish women chemists
Danish chemists
Living people
Year of birth missing (living people)